Jackson Township is one of sixteen townships in Calhoun County, Iowa, United States.  As of the 2000 census, its population was 225.

History
Jackson Township was created in 1866. It is named for Andrew Jackson, seventh President of the United States.

Geography
According to the USGS, it contains one cemetery, Cottonwood.

References

External links
 City-Data.com

Townships in Calhoun County, Iowa
Townships in Iowa